In mathematics, a group is said to be almost simple if it contains a non-abelian simple group and is contained within the automorphism group of that simple group – that is, if it fits between a (non-abelian) simple group and its automorphism group. In symbols, a group A is almost simple if there is a (non-abelian) simple group S such that

Examples 
 Trivially, non-abelian simple groups and the full group of automorphisms are almost simple, but proper examples exist, meaning almost simple groups that are neither simple nor the full automorphism group.
 For  or  the symmetric group  is the automorphism group of the simple alternating group  so  is almost simple in this trivial sense.

Properties 
The full automorphism group of a non-abelian simple group is a complete group (the conjugation map is an isomorphism to the automorphism group), but proper subgroups of the full automorphism group need not be complete.

Structure 
By the Schreier conjecture, now generally accepted as a corollary of the classification of finite simple groups, the outer automorphism group of a finite simple group is a solvable group. Thus a finite almost simple group is an extension of a solvable group by a simple group.

See also 
 Quasisimple group
 Semisimple group

Notes

External links 
 Almost simple group at the Group Properties wiki

Properties of groups